The Prime Minister of Kurdistan Region is the head of the Kurdistan Regional Government, governing Kurdistan Region of Iraq. The government is elected as part of the Kurdistan Parliament.

1992–2005
After the 1992 parliamentary election resulted in the two main parties, the Kurdistan Democratic Party (KDP) and the Patriotic Union of Kurdistan (PUK), each holding 50 out of 100 seats, they decided to create a unity government (which was not recognized by the Ba'athist Iraq, led by Saddam Hussein).

The unity government soon collapsed and in 1994 a civil war broke out, which lasted until 1998. This resulted in the establishment of two Kurdistan Regional Governments in 1996, a KDP-controlled one in Erbil and a PUK-controlled one in Sulaymaniyah, each with their own Prime Minister.

2006–present
After the reconciliation between the KDP and PUK, parliamentary election was held on January 30, 2005, and an agreement was made to let a KDP leader become Prime Minister for the first term and a PUK Prime Minister to become President for the second term, so Nechervan Barzani became Prime Minister. Barham Salih held the post of Prime Minister until 17 January 2012 after which he relinquished his position to Nechervan Idris Barzani.

Prime Ministers of Kurdistan Regional Government:

References

Government of Kurdistan Region
Politics of Kurdistan Region (Iraq)
1992 establishments in Iraq